Centropleura Spur is the southwest spur of a small massif enclosing a cirque, located at the head of Carryer Glacier,  northeast of Mount Jamroga, in the Bowers Mountains, a major mountain range lying within Victoria Land, Antarctica. The spur includes a sedimentary sequence which contains the Middle Cambrian fossil, Centropleura, discovered by scientific parties to this area, 1974–75 and 1981–82. The geographical feature lies situated on the Pennell Coast, a portion of Antarctica lying between Cape Williams and Cape Adare.

References 

Ridges of Victoria Land
Pennell Coast